Budjerah Slabb, known mononymously as Budjerah, is an Aboriginal Australian singer-songwriter from Fingal Head, New South Wales. He is a Coodjinburra man from the Bundjalung nation.
 
His debut single "Missing You" was released in October 2020. Budjerah performed the track live for Australian live music program The Sound on 6 December 2020. After winning the Michael Gudinski Breakthrough Artist award at the 2021 ARIA Awards, Budjerah went on to release his debut EP “Conversations” in April 2022 and launched his first-ever global tour.

Early life
Budjerah Slabb was born in 2002. His parents are licensed pastors. Budjerah told NME "When I was born… it was like 'oh, we gotta do band rehearsal, we gotta do worship practice for Sunday' and I'd come along to that. I think just being surrounded by that, I learned a lot and it just stuck. I've just lived music all my life."
 
Slabb said "I grew up singing Sam Cooke and listening to gospel singers like The Clark Sisters. That's the kind of music that has been around since I was little."

Career

2019–2021: Debut EP

In 2019, Budjerah  auditioned for The Voice (Australian season 8), singing "Climb Every Mountain" but did not progress past the blind auditions.
 
In September 2019, he uploaded the song "River Dry" onto Triple J Unearthed.
 
In 2020, Budjerah found kinship with Matt Corby, who produced his debut EP. In October 2020, Budjerah released his debut single, "Missing You" which topped the Triple J airplay chart.
  
Hayden Daivs from PileRats said "Missing You is a spectacular introductory moment for Budjerah that combines pockets of his life with the music that defined it, bringing together a tapestry of long-time influences spread through soul, hip-hop, R&B, indie and pop only to distil it into a sound that seemingly moves between all of them, capturing the multi-faceted musical brain of someone whose moment has been a long time coming."
 
In March 2021, Apple Music announced Budjerah as its latest local Up Next artist, an initiative to identify and showcase rising talent from across Australia and New Zealand. Budjerah said "I'm really excited to be included in Up Next Local on Apple Music for my brand new EP which I wrote with Matt Corby at his studio just down the road from my house. The songs are about different times in my life and all the different emotions that I feel."

His self-titled debut EP was released on 26 March 2021.

In May 2021, Budjerah released Budjerah (Live At Rainbow Valley) which was recorded at Matt Corby's titular studio and features a live rendition of each of the four tracks on Budjerah's self-titled debut EP. In addition to Corby, fellow artists Ngaiire, Ainslie Wills, JK-47 and Stevan feature on the new EP.

In August 2021, a limited edition CD of the self-titled EP was released. At the 2021 ARIA Music Awards, Budjerah won the ARIA Award for Breakthrough Artist – Release.

On 26 November 2021, Budjerah released "Wash My Sorrows Away".

2022: Conversations

On 25 February 2022, Budjerah announced the release of his forthcoming EP Conversations, released on 8 April 2022 alongside his debut world tour. His single ‘Ready for the Sky’ released in July 2022 has been dubbed “irresistibly smooth” and “a warm slice of soul” that showcases “Budjerah’s immersive vocal and lyrical skills.” 

Budjerah will support Ed Sheeran on his 2023 Australian tour. In February 2023, Budjerah released "Therapy". About the track, Budjerah said "Therapy can come in many forms, but taking a step back and getting an outside perspective is something that has helped me."

Discography

Extended plays

Singles

As lead artist

Music videos

Awards and nominations

AIR Awards
The Australian Independent Record Awards (commonly known informally as AIR Awards) is an annual awards night to recognise, promote and celebrate the success of Australia's Independent Music sector.

! 
|-
| 2022
| "Stranger Love" (with PNAU)
| Best Independent Dance, Electronica or Club Single
| 
|

APRA Awards
The APRA Awards are held in Australia and New Zealand by the Australasian Performing Right Association to recognise songwriting skills, sales and airplay performance by its members annually.

! 
|-
| rowspan="3"| 2022
| Budjerah Slabb
| Breakthrough Songwriter of the Year
| 
| rowspan="2"| 
|-
| rowspan="2"| "Higher" (Budjerah Slabb, Matt Corby)
| Most Performed R&B/Soul Work of the Year
| 
|-
| Song of the Year
| 
| 
|-
| 2023
| "Ready for the Sky"
| Song of the Year 
|  
| 
|-

ARIA Music Awards
The ARIA Music Awards is an annual ceremony presented by Australian Recording Industry Association (ARIA), which recognise excellence, innovation, and achievement across all genres of the music of Australia. They commenced in 1987.

! 
|-
| rowspan="8"| 2021||rowspan="3"| Budjerah || Best Artist || 
| rowspan="8"| 
|-
| Breakthrough Artist ||  
|-
| Best Soul/R&B Release ||  
|-
| Mike Soiza for Budjerah – "Higher" || Best Video || 
|-
| Budjerah 2021 Aus Tour || Best Australian Live Act ||  
|-
|rowspan="2"| Matt Corby for Budjerah – Budjerah (EP) || Producer of the Year ||  
|-
|rowspan="2"| Engineer of the Year ||  
|-
| Chris Collins for Budjerah – Budjerah (EP) ||  
|-
| rowspan="4"| 2022
| rowspan="2"| Conversations
| Best Solo Artist
| 
| rowspan="4"| 
|-
| Best Soul/R&B Release
| 
|-
| The Conversations Australian Tour
| Best Australian Live Act
| 
|-
| Dann Hume & Eric J Dubowsky for Budjerah – Conversations
| Mix Engineer – Best Mixed Album
| 
|-

National Indigenous Music Awards
The National Indigenous Music Awards recognise excellence, innovation and leadership among Aboriginal and Torres Strait Islander musicians from throughout Australia. They commenced in 2004.

! 
|-
! scope="row" rowspan="1"| 2021
| Himself
| New Artist of the Year
| 
| 
|}

Rolling Stone Australia Awards
The Rolling Stone Australia Awards are awarded annually in January or February by the Australian edition of Rolling Stone magazine for outstanding contributions to popular culture in the previous year.

! 
|-
|rowspan="2"| 2023
| "Ready for the Sky"
| Best Single
| 
|rowspan="2"| 
|-
| Budjerah
| Best New Artist
|

References

External links
 

2002 births
21st-century Australian singers
21st-century Australian male singers
APRA Award winners
ARIA Award winners
Indigenous Australian musicians
Living people